Dnevnik starog momka (trans. Diary of an Old Bachelor) is the eleventh studio album released by Serbian and former Yugoslav singer-songwriter Đorđe Balašević.

Balašević's first album after the 2000 political changes in Serbia, Dnevnik starog momka featured only love songs, each having a female name as its title (for this reason most songs remain better known by their unofficial titles, for an example: "Jaroslava" is better known as "Princezo, javi se", "Anđela" as "Moja je draga veštica" etc.). The first letters of the songs' names form the acrostic "Olja je najbolja" (Olja is the best), which refers to Balašević's wife Olivera "Olja" Balašević.

Track listing

Personnel
Đorđe Balašević – vocals
Duda Bezuha – guitar
Aleksandar Dujin – piano, backing vocals
Aleksandar Kravić – bass guitar, backing vocals
Petar Radmilović – drums, backing vocals
Đorđe Petrović – keyboard
Ignac Šen – violin
Gabor Bunford – saxophone, slavinet, backing vocals
Zsadanyi Sandor – cymbal
Sale Vukosaveljević – backing vocals

References

 EX YU ROCK enciklopedija 1960–2006, Janjatović Petar;  

2001 albums
Đorđe Balašević albums
Hi-Fi Centar albums